The STL-1A (or also called the STL-A1) rifle is an assault rifle made in Vietnam. It is produced at the Z111 Factory. The rifle is an improved copy of the AKM rifle, but is commonly compared to an AK-103. The rifle is chambered in 7.62x39mm.

History 
It was originally announced in 2015 that the Z111 Factory would begin producing STL-1A rifles in an occasion to celebrate Vietnamese National Day for Vietnamese defense industry accomplishments. As the STL-1A is based on the older AKM rifles, the factory would convert AKMs and its variants into the new STL-1A rifles. The factory also has the ability to produce these new rifles from scratch.

At the Indo Defence Expo 2018 event, a new variant which combined the STL-1A and the Galil ACE was announced under the name GK3.

In 2019, after several phases of testing, the People's Army of Vietnam started to equip soldiers with the STL-1A.

As of recent, it is unknown whether or not the rifle continues to be manufactured. Due to the more recent creation of the STV Rifles and their adoption as the new standard issued service rifle, it is likely the Z111 Factory has prioritized production of those over the development of the STL-1A.

Design 
Although the rifle itself is a copy of the AKM that highly resembles a Vietnamese version of an AK-103, it's upgraded in many areas such as new polymer handguards, folding stock, a new ergonomic pistol grip and muzzle brake based on the AK-74 with side-mounted rails to attach scopes.

A suppressor and an M203 underbarrel grenade launcher can be attached to the STL-1A.

Variants

STL-1B
A version of the STL-1A with picatinny rails.

References 

7.62×39mm assault rifles
Kalashnikov derivatives
Russia–Vietnam relations
Weapons of Vietnam